The Sunda porcupine (Hystrix javanica) is a species of rodent in the family Hystricidae. It is endemic to Indonesia. Due to the popularity of the hunting and consumption of the Sunda porcupine as an aphrodisiac, the Ministry of Environment and Forestry in Indonesia has listed this species as a protected animal as of June 2018.

References

Hystrix (mammal)
Mammals of Indonesia
Mammals described in 1823
Taxa named by Frédéric Cuvier
Taxonomy articles created by Polbot